ELEX (Eclectic, Lavish, Exhilarating, Xenial) is a science fantasy-themed action role-playing video game developed by Piranha Bytes and published by THQ Nordic. It was released worldwide on 17 October 2017, for PlayStation 4, Xbox One and Windows. The game has been described as an "edgy, dark, uncompromising, and complex" post-apocalyptic sci-fi role-playing game where the protagonist joins the war for the powerful resource, "ELEX", which gives people magic-like powers. The game world is a mix of futuristic and medieval locations, in which the player can use guns, swords and magic against enemies.

Plot 
ELEX is the post-apocalyptic story of the planet Magalan, which was hit by a comet which brought not only mass destruction for its civilization, but also a mysterious and extremely powerful resource called Elex. The few survivors organised themselves in factions, each with a different vision of the future and distinct ways of using Elex. The Berserkers reject technology and purify the Elex by transforming it into Mana in order to obtain magical but natural powers; they do this by growing World Hearts, large plants that they believe heal the ground and thus the planet. The Outlaws only want profit and freedom. They use any modern weapons and technology they can find, being masters of putting to use any old scrap; they use Elex to create powerful drugs. The Clerics believe in a god called Calaan, are the most knowledgeable and technologically advanced faction, and believe that their religion can save the world.

These factions – the Free People – fight each other over resources, land, and Elex, but they all share a common enemy: the Albs. The Albs are ex-Clerics who decided they should use Elex by consuming it directly into their bodies, making them very strong at the cost of their emotions and skin pigmentation. They use the most advanced technology of Magalan and work blindly under the command of the Hybrid, an ancient being that wants to gather all the Elex of the planet to achieve a new state of evolution for the Albs.

Jax, the protagonist, is an Alb Commander on a special mission. His aircraft is shot down by an unknown enemy and then crashes over a mountain. He is knocked out for days, in which time most of the Elex clears out of his body, leaving him weak and alone in an unknown location and with a "Chaos of Emotions" (as one of the quests is called). He needs to regain his powers by joining a faction. He learns about how the Free People live while at the same time tries to understand what happened on the day of the crash and who attacked him.

The player is in charge of many key points in the story (including the ending) by deciding if Jax is a cold person (logical and rational) who keeps his Alb personality and goals, or more emotional by helping and siding with the Free People.

Gameplay 
ELEX is an action role-playing game set in a post-apocalyptic open world environment and played from a third-person perspective. The player can use both swords and firearms, with magic becoming available later. The game includes mutated creatures as one of the enemy types, and has an interconnected quest system that supports player choices. The player may join up with one of three factions – the Berserkers who use Elex for magical purposes, the Clerics who use the substance to power their machines, or the Outlaws who embrace an "everyone for themselves" philosophy.

Development 
ELEX was announced during Gamescom 2015, where Piranha Bytes and Nordic Games confirmed their partnership on the project. It was featured as a cover story in the German magazine GameStar. The game was developed using Piranha Bytes' proprietary Genome game engine.

Reception 

ELEX received "mixed or average" reviews from critics, according to Metacritic.

Sequel 
On 15 June 2021, THQ Nordic and Piranha Bytes announced ELEX II, a direct sequel to the first game. The game released on 1 March 2022 for PlayStation 4, PlayStation 5, Xbox One, Xbox Series X/S and Windows.

References

External links 
 

2017 video games
Open-world video games
PlayStation 4 games
Role-playing video games
Action role-playing video games
Science fantasy video games
Science fiction video games
THQ Nordic games
Video games developed in Germany
Video games set on fictional planets
Windows games
Xbox One games
Xbox One X enhanced games